Thorning is a town located in Silkeborg Municipality in Region Midtjylland in Jutland in central Denmark.

Geography
Its territory has two differentiated zones: the southwestern part is occupied by the Kompedal Plantage forest while the northeastern part is dedicated to agriculture. It is characterized by the presence of gentle hills. Haller Å it runs through its southern part and Tange Sø runs through the central and north. The latter also passes next to the urban area. Nipgård Sø is also located north of the town.

References

Cities and towns in the Central Denmark Region
Silkeborg Municipality